The Australian PPL (Private Pilot License) is issued by the Civil Aviation Safety Authority, the Australian federal agency responsible for the regulation and safety of private and commercial flight.

In order to gain a PPL in Australia, the minimum requirements are:

Obtain a mark of 70% or more in the CASA aeroplane or helicopter exam, which tests all seven subjects listed in the Day VFR Syllabus. Hold a class 2 or greater medical. Have a total of 40 hours total flight time, of which 10 must be pilot in command, which must consist of a minimum of 5 hours cross country solo, and a 2 hours instrument flying must also be required before being eligible to hold a PPL.

Privileges 
The Australian PPL allows private pilots to operate single engine aircraft in Day VFR conditions throughout all Australian airspace classes. For students upgrading from a Recreational Pilots License (RPL), it removes the 1500kg Maximum Takeoff Weight limitation, allowing pilots to fly any Australian registered aircraft as pilot in command, providing they hold appropriate endorsements for that specific type. 

PPL holders may go on to gain a Night VFR rating, Private Instrument Rating (PIFR) to fly under the Instrument Flight Rules (IFR), including at night and in adverse weather, Multi Engine Aeroplane (MEA) Class Ratings, and other operational privileges and endorsements such as aerobatics and aircraft design features. 

PPL holders may operate Australian registered aircraft in foreign airspace, subject to the regulations of the relevant government aviation authorities. 

Under a PPL, Australian pilots are limited to 5 passengers onboard their aircraft, regardless of aircraft seating capacity.

References

External links
 Getting your private pilot licence
 Pre-Qualifications | Civil Aviation Safety Authority
 Licence types | Civil Aviation Safety Authority

Aviation in Australia